Michèle Magny (born 1944) is a Canadian actress, playwright and theatre director from Montreal, Quebec. She was a Governor General's Award nominee for French-language drama at the 1995 Governor General's Awards, for her play Marina, le dernier rose aux joues.

A 1968 graduate of the National Theatre School of Canada, she began her career with roles in films such as Don't Let the Angels Fall and The House of Light (La Chambre blanche). Her other credits have included the films O or the Invisible Infant (Ô ou l'invisible enfant), Taureau, La Piastre, The Disappearance, The Machine Age (L'Âge de la machine), To Be Sixteen (Avoir 16 ans) and Wild Flowers (Les Fleurs sauvages), and the television series Mont-Joye, Maigrichon et Gras-Double and La Bonne Aventure.

More prominent as a stage actress, her performances have included productions of the collective play La Nef des sorcières, Michel Tremblay's Bonjour, là, bonjour, Anne Legault's O'Neill, Denise Boucher's Les Fées ont soif, and a French translation of Tom Stoppard's The Real Thing. She has directed productions of Jacques Rampal's Célimène et le cardinal, Jovette Marchessault's Anaïs dans la queue de la comète, Sam Shepard's Fool for Love, Edward Albee's Who's Afraid of Virginia Woolf?, and Elliott Hayes's Homeward Bound.

Her second stage play, Un carré de ciel (2004), portrayed the life of writer Jacques Ferron. She has also written two radio plays for Ici Radio-Canada Première, La plume et le scalpel and Histoire de gare et d'amour.

References

External links

1944 births
Living people
20th-century Canadian actresses
20th-century Canadian dramatists and playwrights
20th-century Canadian women writers
21st-century Canadian actresses
21st-century Canadian dramatists and playwrights
21st-century Canadian women writers
Canadian women dramatists and playwrights
Canadian film actresses
Canadian stage actresses
Canadian television actresses
Canadian dramatists and playwrights in French
Canadian theatre directors
French Quebecers
Actresses from Montreal
Writers from Montreal
National Theatre School of Canada alumni